Stanča is a Slavic toponym. It may refer to:

Stanča, Slovakia, a village and municipality in the Trebišov District in the Košice Region of south-eastern Slovakia
Stanča, Republic of Macedonia
Stanča (Kraljevo), a village in Kraljevo municipality in Serbia

See also
Stanca (disambiguation)
Stânca (disambiguation)